The Yellow Canary is a 1963 American thriller film directed by Buzz Kulik and starring Pat Boone and Barbara Eden. It was adapted by Rod Serling from a novel by Whit Masterson, who also wrote the novel that was the basis for Orson Welles' Touch of Evil. The film was photographed by veteran Floyd Crosby and scored by jazz composer Kenyon Hopkins.

Plot
Andy Paxton (Boone) is an arrogant, obnoxious pop idol who is about to be divorced by his wife Lissa (Eden) and constantly abuses his staff, including his bodyguard – ex-cop Hub, his manager Vecchio, and his valet, Bake.

Andy begins an engagement at the Huntington Hartford Theater in Los Angeles. Hub and he arrive home to find a maid hysterical – his infant son Bobby has been kidnapped and the son's nurse murdered. The ransom note has the code word "canary" and they summon the police, led by Lt Bonner (Klugman).
Andy does not tell the police about the code word out of fear that his son may be killed. A second message arrives demanding $200,000 ransom, which Andy manages to raise, and the money is delivered to an isolated beach, but nobody comes to meet him. Hub takes Andy to a lonely inn and tortures a woman into giving them the address of a man who might have been in touch with the kidnappers. They find the man, but he is dead.

After Bake is found murdered, Andy receives further instructions by telephone from the kidnapper, and realizes that Hub is one of the few people who know their unlisted number. Andy and Lissa return to the inn and rescue their baby, and Andy shoots the mentally deranged Hub as police cars surround the inn.

Cast
Pat Boone as Andy Paxton
Barbara Eden as Lissa Paxton
Steve Forrest as Hub Wiley
Jack Klugman as Lt. Bonner
Jesse White as Ed Thornburg
Steve Harris as Bake
Milton Selzer as Vecchio
Jeff Corey as Joe Pyle
Harold Gould as Ponelli
John Banner as Skolman

Production

Development
In 1961, Pete Levathes, head of 20th Century Fox, authorised the studio to pay $200,000 for the rights to Whit Masterton's novel Evil Come Evil Go. The film was always envisioned as a vehicle for Pat Boone, who had made a number of movies for Fox; he had a three-picture deal with the studio at fee of $200,000 per movie, which would be credited to his production company, Cooga Mooga Productions.

Rod Serling, then at the height of his Twilight Zone fame, was paid $125,000 to write the script. With a star and writer of that caliber, the film was originally estimated to have a budget  between $1.5 and 2.0 million and be shot over 10 weeks. Ann-Margret was mentioned as a possibility for the female lead.

Film becomes low-budget
Peter Levathes was fired in the wake of cost over-runs on Cleopatra, and Darryl F. Zanuck took over the studio. Zanuck called a halt to all productions at the studio, literally shutting down the backlot on 26 July 1962.

Zanuck was obliged to pay a fee to Boone and Serling. By this stage, the studio also had commitments to Barbara Eden and Steve Forrest (the latter at a fee of $25,000). Zanuck assigned the film to Robert L. Lippert's company, Associated Producers Inc, who specialized in making lower-budget films for Fox. Zanuck gave Lippert $100,000 to finish the film and a shortened schedule. (Maury Dexter, who produced the film for Lipper, puts this figure at $250,000 in his memoirs.)

The New York Times reported that Boone "fears that the 10-day shooting schedule will deny it the artistic and production values it might have had with the 10-week shooting schedule he expected" – he decided to proceed with the film anyway.

Filming
Filming began on 10 December 1962. Some shooting was done for the film on the Fox lot, which was otherwise closed. During production, the title was changed to The Yellow Canary.

The cast included Jeff Corey, who had been blacklisted and not made a movie for a number of years. Boone had been taught by Corey and he pressured the studio into casting him.

In a September 2012 interview at the UCLA Film and Television Archive, Boone stated that the film was slated for a ridiculously short 12-day schedule. When they were wrapping the last day with several key scenes left to be filmed, Boone paid $20,000 out of his own pocket to buy one more day of shooting. He felt strongly about the film because it gave him the chance to play "a bad guy for a change."

Maury Dexter later recalled:
The film was a nice production, but didn’t really come off. It did nothing at the box office and the critics panned it. Serling, Boone, Forrest, and Eden were all play-or-pay contracts, so... [Fox] preferred to play instead of paying off the commitments. (Probably should not have thrown good money after bad.) I produced the show, and with due respect to all concerned, the production overshadowed the drama.

Reception
According to Diabolique magazine:
Boone whined about Fox's cheapness, but Zanuck was right. Serling's script isn’t very good with too much flowery dialogue. Because it's a thriller, the low budget didn’t necessarily have to hurt in the hands of an imaginative director. But Dexter was a second-rater. It is interesting to see Boone play someone unpleasant who proves his manhood by shooting someone dead. This was a rare film where the actor used a gun. The movie flopped at the box office.

References

External links

Review of film in The New York Times
Review of film at Variety

1963 films
1960s thriller films
American thriller films
Films directed by Buzz Kulik
20th Century Fox films
Films based on American novels
Films about child abduction in the United States
Films scored by Kenyon Hopkins
Films with screenplays by Rod Serling
1960s English-language films
1960s American films